Minister of Agriculture and Fisheries of Angola is a cabinet level position in the national government. The position was established in 1975 with Manuel Pedro Pacavira.

Name changes
 1975–1991: Minister of Agriculture
 1992–2016: Minister of Agriculture and Rural Development
 2017–2020: Minister of Agriculture and Forestry
 2020–present: Minister of Agriculture and Fisheries

Ministers of Minister of Agriculture and Fisheries
 1975–1981: Manuel Pedro Pacavira
 1981–1983: Artur Vidal Gomes Kumbi Diezabu
 1983–1987: Evaristo Domingos Kimba
 1987–1991: Fernando Faustino Muteka
 1991–2002: Isaac Francisco Maria dos Anjos
 2002–2007: Gilberto Buta Lutucuta
 2007–2016: Afonso Pedro Canga
 2016–2019: Marcos Alexandre Nhunga
 2019–present: António Francisco de Assis

References

External links
 http://www.minagrip.gov.ao/
 https://governo.gov.ao/ao/gca/index.php?id=232

Agriculture and Fisheries
Agriculture Ministers
Politics of Angola